David Joseph Weldon (born August 31, 1953) is an American politician and physician. He was a Republican member of the United States House of Representatives, representing , and was an unsuccessful candidate for the Republican nomination in Florida's 2012 U.S. Senate race.

Early life, education, and medical career

Weldon was born on Long Island, New York to Anna (née Mallardi) and David David Joseph Weldon Sr. His father was a combat-decorated World War II veteran. After graduating Phi Beta Kappa from Stony Brook University in 1978, he earned his M.D. degree at the University at Buffalo School of Medicine in 1981. He was inducted into Alpha Omega Alpha. Weldon served in the United States Army from 1981 to 1987 and the United States Army Reserve from 1987 until 1992. He practiced as a physician in Florida after becoming an MD.

Tenure in Congress
In response to the legal battle over the removal of the feeding tube of Terri Schiavo, Weldon introduced legislation to force review of the case by the federal government. Weldon, who has a medical degree, believed that Schiavo was not in a vegetative state. He supported his belief saying, "She responds to verbal stimuli, she attempts to vocalize, she tracks with her eyes, she emotes, she attempts to kiss her father."

In December, 2005, Weldon joined with several other Congressmen to form the Second Amendments, a bipartisan rock and country band set to play for United States troops stationed overseas over the holiday season. Weldon plays the bass guitar.

Committee assignments
U.S. House Committee on Appropriations
Subcommittee on Labor, Health and Human Services, Education, and Related Agencies
Subcommittee on State, Foreign Operations, and Related Programs
U.S. House Committee on Science
U.S. House Committee on Education and the Workforce
U.S. House Committee on Banking
U.S. House Committee on Government Reform
Republican Study Committee

Caucus memberships
Chair and co-founder, Congressional Aerospace Caucus
Chair and co-founder, Congressional Israel Allies Caucus

Elections
1994
Weldon decided to run in Florida's 15th congressional district, vacated by Democratic U.S. Congressman Jim Bacchus. He was one of seven Republicans to file for the primary. On September 8, he ranked first with 24% of the vote, but failed to reach the 50% threshold to win outright. In the October 4 run-off election, he defeated Carole Jean Jordan 54–46%. In the November general election, he defeated Democrat Sue Munsey 54–46%.

1996
Won re-election to a second term defeating John L. Byron 51–43%.

1998
Won re-election to a third term with 63% of the vote.

2000
Won re-election to a fourth term with 59% of the vote.

2002
Won re-election to a fifth term with 63% of the vote.

2004
Won re-election to a sixth term with 65% of the vote.

2006
Former presidential candidate Bob Bowman, a Democrat, challenged Weldon in 2006. The incumbent raised significantly more campaign funds than Bowman. By the end of September, Weldon's total was $673,321 versus $21,944 for Bowman. Weldon also refused to debate Bowman during the campaign. In the November election, Weldon received 125,596 votes to Bowman's 97,947. Weldon won re-election to a seventh term with 56% of the vote.

2008
On January 25, 2008, claiming "He never wanted to be a career politician", Weldon announced he would not seek an eighth term and would be returning to his medical practice. He endorsed state Senator Bill Posey to succeed him.

2012 U.S. Senate election

Weldon decided to run for the U.S. Senate in 2012 in the hope of facing Democratic incumbent Bill Nelson. His opponent in the Republican primary was U.S. Representative Connie Mack IV. Weldon ran as a Christian conservative, and trailed Mack in both funding and name recognition. He lost the Republican primary with 20% of the vote, coming in second behind Mack's 59%. Mack went on to lose the general election to Nelson, 42-55%.

Post-politics
Weldon has a medical practice at Health First Medical Group in Malabar, Florida.

See also
 2008 United States House of Representatives elections in Florida

References

External links

Congressman Dave Weldon official U.S. House website
Dave Weldon for Congress official campaign website

Online Focus: U.S. Rep. Dave Weldon (interview re: stem cell research), Public Broadcasting Service (August 9, 2004)
Rep. Dave Weldon, M.D. testimony before the Institute of Medicine Immunization Safety Review Committee, SafeMinds (January 11, 2001)

1953 births
Living people
People from Indialantic, Florida
University at Buffalo alumni
People from Amityville, New York
Stony Brook University alumni
United States Army officers
Republican Party members of the United States House of Representatives from Florida
21st-century American politicians
20th-century American politicians
Candidates in the 2012 United States elections
20th-century American physicians
United States Army reservists